The Cambodia national under-17 football team is the national under-17 team of Cambodia and is administered by the Football Federation of Cambodia.

Competition Records

AFC U-16 Championship record

Note: Variation between under-17 and under-16 tournaments.

1985 to 1998: Did Not Enter
2000: Did not qualify
2002: Did not qualify
2004: Did not qualify
2006: Did not enter
2008: Disqualified
2010: Did not qualify
2012: Did not qualify
2014: Did not enter
2016: Did not qualify
2018: Did not qualify
2020: Did not qualify

AFF U-16 Championship record

Note: 2002 to 2007 competitions were under-17 level tournaments. Variation between under-16 and under-15 tournaments after 2007.

2002: Group stage
2005: Group stage
2006: Did not enter
2007: Group stage
2008: Did not enter
2009: Canceled
2010: Did not enter
2011: Group stage
2012: Did not enter
2013: Group stage
2014: Cancelled
2015: Group stage
2016: Fourth place
2017: Group stage
2018: Group stage
2019: Group stage
2022: Group stage

Fixture and results

2016 AFF U-16 Youth Championship

Players

Current squad
The following final 23 players were called up for

|-----
! colspan=9 style="background:#000080" align="left" |
|----- bgcolor="#DFEDFD"

|-----
! colspan=9 style="background:#000080" align="left" |
|----- bgcolor="#DFEDFD"

|-----
! colspan=9 style="background:#000080" align="left" |
|----- bgcolor="#DFEDFD"

Coaching staff

See also

Leagues
 Cambodian Premier League
 Cambodian League 2

Cups
 Hun Sen Cup
 CNCC League Cup
 Cambodian Super Cup

National teams
Men
 Cambodia national football team
 Cambodia national under-23 football team
 Cambodia national under-21 football team
Women
 Cambodia women's national football team
Futsal
 Cambodia national futsal team

Other
 Football in Cambodia
 Cambodian Football Federation

References

Cambodia national football team
Asian national under-17 association football teams